Seven vessels of the British Royal Navy have been named HMS Daring.

 , a 12-gun  launched in 1804 and destroyed after running aground in 1813.
 , a 12-gun brig launched in 1844 and broken up in 1864.
 , a  4-gun composite sloop launched in 1874 and broken up in 1889.
 , a  launched in 1893 and broken up in 1912.
 HMS Daring, a planned  ordered in March 1918, but cancelled in November the same year
 , a  D-class destroyer launched in 1932 and sunk in 1940.
 , a  launched in 1949 and broken up in 1971.
 , a Type 45 destroyer launched on 1 February 2006.

Royal Navy ship names